The ZINC database (recursive acronym: ZINC is not commercial) is a curated collection of commercially available chemical compounds prepared especially for virtual screening. ZINC is used by investigators (generally people with training as biologists or chemists) in pharmaceutical companies, biotechnology companies, and research universities.

Scope and access 
ZINC is different from other chemical databases because it aims to represent the biologically relevant, three dimensional form of the molecule.

Curation and updates 
ZINC is updated regularly and may be downloaded and used free of charge. It is developed by John Irwin in the Shoichet Laboratory in the Department of Pharmaceutical Chemistry at the University of California, San Francisco.

Version  
The latest release of the website interface is  "ZINC 15" (2015). The previous website was at ZINC, but the maintainers recommend moving to ZINC15 because of its better search capabilities. The database contents are continuously updated.

See also  
 PubChem a database of small molecules from the chemical and biological literature, hosted by NCBI
 ChEMBL, a database of information about medicinal chemistry and biological activities of small molecules.

External links  
 ZINC database

Chemical databases
Biological databases